The 1985 CONCACAF Champions' Cup was the 21st. edition of the annual international club football competition held in the CONCACAF region (North America, Central America and the Caribbean), the CONCACAF Champions' Cup. It determined that year's club champion of football in the CONCACAF region and was played from 9 April 1985 till 26 January 1986.

The teams were split into 2 zones, North/Central America and Caribbean, (as North and Central America sections combined to qualify one team for the final), each one qualifying the winner to the final tournament. All the matches in the tournament were played under the home/away match system.

Trinidadian side Defence Force beat Hondurean team Olimpia 2–1 on aggregate, becoming CONCACAF champion for the first time in their history and also the first club from that country to win the competition.

North/Central American Zone

First round

Aurora advances to the fourth round.
Olimpia, Suchitepéquez, Vida and América advance to the second round.

Second round

Olimpia and América advance to the third round.

Third round

Olimpia advances to the fourth round.

Fourth round

Olimpia advances to the CONCACAF Final.

Caribbean Zone
The following clubs reportedly entered: SUBT Violette Boys' Town Tivoli Gardens Aiglon du Lamentin SV Robinhoodbut it is not known whether they played any matches.

First round

Further matches and results are unknown among clubs at this stage.

Second round

Apparently played over one leg.
Further matches and results are unknown among clubs at this stage.

Third round

Further matches and results are unknown among clubs at this stage.

Final Round

Defence Force apparently beat Montjoly in the final roundto qualify as winners of the Caribbean Zone.

Final

First leg

Second leg 

 Defence Force won 2–1 on aggregate.

Champion

References

1
CONCACAF Champions' Cup
c
c